Decisiones: Unos ganan, otros pierden (English: Decisions: Some Win and Others Lose), is a new season of the anthology drama television series Decisiones. The season is produced by Telemundo Global Studios, and is recorded in 4K Ultra-high-definition television. Martha Godoy serves as showrunner of the season. It premiered on 10 December 2019 on Telemundo, and concluded on 29 November 2020. The season has Rodrigo Figueroa, Marcela Mejía, José Vicente Scheuren as executive producers. The concept was in charge of Juan Marcos Blanco, Sergio Mendoza and Marcos Santana, with the participation of Héctor Suárez Gomís as an advisor.

Premise 
The new season—is more inclined towards thriller, suspense and action—tell stories that are affecting ordinary people today. Inspired by high profile research, cases of human identity, social and political struggles, each episode focuses on a transcendental decision that will change the lives of the main characters in a moving, extraordinary and radical way. At the end of each episode, current statistics related to the central plot will be included, which were prepared by Noticias Telemundo to create awareness and reflection on the issues.

Notable guest stars 
Each episode of the series is starring notable Telemundo actors, who have recently entered the channel or have been working for Telemundo for several years. The first episode of the series entitled "El Cazador" is starring Litzy, who has been part of the network for several years. The second episode entitled "Furia en el tráfico" starred Jorge Luis Pila, who since 2016 did not carry out a television project. The third episode entitled "El baúl" stars Laura Flores and Adriano Zendejas. The fourth episode entitled "Videos íntimos" is starring Javier Jattin, who months ago had confirmed to stop making telenovelas. The fifth episode entitled "Sueño en tinieblas" is stars by the Venezuelan actor Luciano D'Alessandro, who recently joined Telemundo.

Television rating 
 
}}

Episodes

Notes

References

External links 
 

2019 American television series debuts
2019 American television seasons
Telemundo telenovelas
Telemundo original programming
Spanish-language television programming in the United States
Spanish-language television shows
2019 telenovelas
2020 American television series endings
2020 American television seasons